Noyabrsk Airport  is an airport in Yamalo-Nenets Autonomous Okrug, Russia located 11 km west of Noyabrsk. It handles small airliners. It serves as hub for UTair. It is a modern airport capable of landing large aircraft.

Airlines and destinations

References

External links
Noyabrsk Airport webpage on Surgut Airport website 

Noyabrsk
Airports built in the Soviet Union
Airports in Yamalo-Nenets Autonomous Okrug